Ernest Van "Pop" Stoneman (May 25, 1893 – June 14, 1968) was an American musician, ranked among the prominent recording artists of country music's first commercial decade.

Biography
Born in a log cabin in Monarat (Iron Ridge), Carroll County, Virginia, United States, near what would later become Galax, Virginia, Stoneman was left motherless at age three and was raised by his father and three musically inclined cousins, who taught him the instrumental and vocal traditions of Blue Ridge mountain culture. He became a singer and songwriter, and proficient musician on the guitar, autoharp, harmonica, clawhammer banjo, and jaw harp.

When he married Hattie Frost in November 1918, he entered another musically involved family. He and Hattie had 23 children, 13 of whom survived to adulthood: 
Eddie Lewis (deceased 2001)
Irma Grace (deceased 2003)
John Catron (deceased 2001)
Pattie Inez "Patsy" (deceased 2015)
Joseph William (Billy) (deceased 1990)
Jack Monroe (deceased 1992)
Gene Austin (deceased 2005)
Dean Clark (deceased 1989)
Calvin Scott (Scotty) (deceased 1973)
Donna LaVerne
Oscar James (Jimmy) (deceased 2002)
Veronica Loretta (Roni)
Van Haden (deceased 1995).

Stoneman worked at a variety of jobs, in mines, mills, but mostly carpentry, and played music for his own enjoyment and that of his neighbors, but when he heard a Henry Whitter record in 1924, he determined to better it and changed his life. Stoneman went to New York City in September 1924 and cut two songs for the Okeh Records label. The record was shelved and he had to return for another recording session in January 1925. The resultant debut single release, "Sinking of the Titanic," went on to become one of the biggest hits of the 1920s.  Ralph Peer directed him through several sessions for Okeh and Victor, and he freelanced on other labels such as Edison, Gennett and Paramount Records. In 1926, he added family musicians to his group for a full string band sound.

In July and August 1927, Stoneman helped Peer conduct the Bristol sessions that led to the discovery of the Carter Family and Jimmie Rodgers. He continued to be active in recording through 1929. Between 1925 and 1929 Stoneman recorded more than 200 songs.

Falling on hard times during the Depression, the Stonemans and their nine surviving children moved to the Washington, D.C. area in 1932, after losing their home and most of their possessions. There they had four more children and struggled through dire poverty, with Stoneman taking whatever work he could find and trying to revive his musical career.

In 1941, Stoneman bought a lot in Carmody Hills, Maryland, where he built a shack for the family, and eventually obtained a more or less regular job at the Naval Gun Factory. In 1947, the Stoneman Family won a talent contest at Constitution Hall that gave them six months' exposure on local television. In 1956, Pop won $10,000 on the NBC-TV quiz show The Big Surprise and sang on the show. That same year, the Blue Grass Champs, a group composed largely of his children, were winners on the CBS-TV program Arthur Godfrey's Talent Scouts, and Mike Seeger recorded Pop and Hattie for Folkways.

Stoneman retired from labor and the Champs went full-time to become the Stonemans. They recorded albums for Starday in 1962 and 1963 and in 1964, went to Texas and California, cutting an album for World Pacific, playing at Disneyland, on some network shows and at several folk festivals. This included an appearance at the Monterey Folk Festival.

In 1965, they went to Nashville, where they signed a contract with MGM Records and started a syndicated TV show. They received CMA's "Vocal Group of the Year" in 1967. They appeared in the 1967 film Hell on Wheels and in The Road to Nashville (1967).

Death 
Pop Stoneman died in 1968 at age 75. He is interred in the Mount Olivet Cemetery in Nashville.

Honors 
On February 12, 2008, Ernest "Pop" Stoneman was inducted into the Country Music Hall of Fame and in 2009 he and his wife Hattie Frost Stoneman were enshrined in the Gennett Records Walk of Fame.

The first major retrospective of his musical career, Ernest Stoneman: The Unsung Father of Country Music 1925–1934 (5 String Productions) was issued in 2008 by the Grammy award-winning reissue team of Christopher C. King and Henry Sapoznik and was nominated for a 2009 Grammy award for "Best Album Notes."

The Stonemans discography

Albums

Compilations

Singles

References

External links

Ernest V. Stoneman remembered – Patsy Stoneman Murphy interviewed by Jerry Fabris on Thomas Edison's Attic radio program, WFMU, November 15, 2005.
Early recording (1926) of When the Work's All Done This Fall.
Early recording of (1926) Wild Bill Jones.
1994 inductee in the Autoharp Hall of Fame. Retrieved August 5, 2015
2008 inductee in the Country Music Hall of Fame. Retrieved August 5, 2015
Ernest V. Stoneman cylinder recordings, from the UCSB Cylinder Audio Archive at the University of California, Santa Barbara Library.
 Ernest V. Stoneman recordings at the Discography of American Historical Recordings.

1893 births
1968 deaths
American country singer-songwriters
Singer-songwriters from Virginia
Musicians from Appalachia
American television personalities
People from Carroll County, Virginia
Gennett Records artists
Starday Records artists
Country Music Hall of Fame inductees
Members of the Country Music Association
20th-century American singers
Burials at Mount Olivet Cemetery (Nashville)
Singer-songwriters from West Virginia